Margaux Chrétien (born 11 December 1992) is a French competitor in synchronized swimming who competed in the 2011 World Aquatics Championships and 2013 World Aquatics Championships.

References

1992 births
Living people
French synchronized swimmers
Synchronized swimmers at the 2015 World Aquatics Championships
Synchronized swimmers at the 2013 World Aquatics Championships
Synchronized swimmers at the 2011 World Aquatics Championships
Synchronized swimmers at the 2016 Summer Olympics
Olympic synchronized swimmers of France